Memoirs of a Geisha: Original Motion Picture Soundtrack is the film score to the 2005 film of the same name, composed and conducted by John Williams. The original score and songs were composed and conducted by Williams and features Yo-Yo Ma and Itzhak Perlman as cellist and violinist, respectively. The soundtrack album was released by Sony Classical Records on November 22, 2005.

The score won the Golden Globe Award for Best Original Score, BAFTA Award for Best Film Music and the Grammy Award for Best Score Soundtrack for Visual Media. It was also nominated for the Academy Award for Best Original Score but lost to the original score of the film Brokeback Mountain.

Track listing 
 Sayuri's Theme 1:31
 The Journey to the Hanamachi 4:06
 Going to School 2:42
 Brush on Silk 2:31
 Chiyo's Prayer 3:36
 Becoming a Geisha 4:52
 Finding Satsu 3:44
 The Chairman's Waltz 2:39
 The Rooftops of the Hanamachi 3:49
 The Garden Meeting 2:44
 Dr. Crab's Prize 2:18
 Destiny's Path 3:20
 A New Name... A New Life 3:33
 The Fire Scene and the Coming of War 6:48
 As the Water... 2:01
 Confluence 3:42
 A Dream Discarded 2:00
 Sayuri's Theme and End Credits 5:06
Total Time: 61:02

Credits
Yo-Yo Ma – cello
Itzhak Perlman – violin
Masakazu Yoshizawa - shakuhachi, tsutsumi
Masayo Ishigure - koto
Hiromi Hashibe - koto
 Tateo Takahashi - shamisen

References

2005 soundtrack albums
2000s film soundtrack albums
John Williams soundtracks
Grammy Award for Best Score Soundtrack for Visual Media